A , also shortened to  and referred to as red veil in English, is a traditional red-coloured bridal veil worn by the Han Chinese brides to cover their faces on their wedding ceremony before their wedding night. The  is worn along with a red wedding dress. Veils have been used in China since the Han dynasty.

Cultural significance and symbolism 
In Chinese culture, the colour red symbolizes good luck, happiness, joy, and celebration. The colour white, which is used in Western Christian weddings, symbolizes death in Chinese culture rather than holiness and purity. The colour white used to be avoided in Chinese weddings in the past.

Cultural practice 
According to tradition, the groom would fetch his bride at her home in a palanquin on the morning of their wedding day. When they arrived at the groom's home, they would perform the wedding ceremonies and rituals (including the Heaven and Earth worship, etc.). When the bride was brought to the wedding room, but just before entering the room, the groom would use a stick to remove her  and throw it on the roof while never looking at her face. It was only after the bride entered the room and returned for the  that the groom and the wedding guests would see her face for the first time.

History 

Construction and design 
The  is a square of red fabric.

See also

 Mili (veil)
 Veil
 
 Cheongsam
  – Phoenix coronet

 Hanfu
 Hanfu headgear

Notes

References 

Chinese traditional clothing
Chinese headgear

Marriage in Chinese culture
Wedding dresses